Gemelliporina is a genus of bryozoans belonging to the family Cleidochasmatidae.

The species of this genus are found in North and Central America.

Species:

Gemelliporina glabra 
Gemelliporina hastata 
Gemelliporina punctata

References

Bryozoan genera